The Little Mermaid is a 1976 Soviet fantasy film directed by Vladimir Bychkov based on the 1837 fairy tale of "The Little Mermaid" by Hans Christian Andersen.

Plot
The story is set in the 13th century. The little mermaid sees a prince on a ship from a distance and falls in love with him. Other mermaids mesmerize the sailors into crashing their ship on to the rocks. The mermaid saves the prince from drowning and brings him to shore. A local princess notices the unconscious prince and rescues him. The mermaid wants to marry the prince and swims towards palace where the princess lives. One of the fishermen spots her and they all throw rocks at her. She hides for safety in the canal within the palace. A traveling handyman befriends her. He enlists the help of a local witch who demands her hair and sweet voice for transforming her tail into legs. The witch takes the mermaid's hair but does not take her voice. The traveling handyman contacts the prince who is recovering at the palace and tells him about the mermaid. By then, the mermaid is about to be burned at the stake by the people who had caught her. The prince saves the mermaid and the princess takes the mermaid in her care. The prince fights off a local challenger in a joust to marry the princess. But, the challenger stabs the prince in the back when he was not looking. Everyone abandons the prince now that he is dead. The mermaid begs the witch to revive the prince. The witch does so but warns her that if the prince does not marry the mermaid, she will die. The prince comes back alive but does not marry the mermaid. He marries the princess and the mermaid is destined to die on the same day. The traveling handyman challenges the prince to a fight and is killed. His sacrifice spares the mermaid from death and her soul becomes eternal.

Cast 
Viktoriya Novikova as the Little Mermaid
Valentin Nikulin as Sulpitius and Hans Christian Andersen
Yuri Senkevich as the Prince (Antoine)
Galina Volchek as the Witch
Galina Artyomova as the Princess
 Stefan Iliev
 Svetlana Mojseyenko as Zhaklin
 Margarita Chudinova as Leonella
 Mikhail Pugovkin

External links 
 

Gorky Film Studio films
1970s Russian-language films
Russian children's fantasy films
Films based on The Little Mermaid
Films shot in Bulgaria
1970s Bulgarian-language films
Films shot in Georgia (country)
Films shot in Ukraine
Soviet fantasy films
Soviet romance films
Russian romantic drama films
Soviet multilingual films
Films about witchcraft
Bulgarian multilingual films
1976 multilingual films
Bulgarian speculative fiction films
Soviet children's films

Films about mermaids
Films about shapeshifting